Ballachulish Ferry was a railway station on the south shore at the narrows of Loch Leven at South Ballachulish in Highland region, Scotland. It was on the Ballachulish branch line that linked Connel Ferry, on the main line of the Callander and Oban Railway, with Ballachulish.

History 
Ballachulish Ferry station opened on 24 August 1903. It had one platform, on the north side of the line. 

The station then passed to the Scottish Region of British Railways on nationalisation in 1948 and was closed by the British Railways Board in 1966, when the Ballachulish Branch closed.

References

Notes

Sources 
 
 
 
 
 Ballachulish Ferry station on navigable 1954 map

Railway stations in Great Britain opened in 1903
Railway stations in Great Britain closed in 1966
Disused railway stations in Highland (council area)
Beeching closures in Scotland
Former Caledonian Railway stations